Carlos Rigoberto Alonso Gómez (born August 25, 1979) is a retired Nicaraguan footballer.

Club career
A much-travelled defender, Alonso made his league debut with FC Chinandega in 1996 and played for several Nicaraguan league clubs in a career spanning over 15 years. His clubs include Walter Ferretti, Real Estelí, Parmalat and Diriangén. In summer 2006 he joined Scorpión after just winning the league with Diriangén.

In January 2010 he left VCP Chinandega and returned to Estelí, only to sign with América in November 2010.

International career
Alonso made his debut for Nicaragua in a March 2000 World Cup qualification match against El Salvador and has earned a total of 37 caps, scoring no goals. He has represented his country in 5 FIFA World Cup qualification matches and played at the 2001, 2003, 2005, 2007, 2009 UNCAF Nations Cups, as well as at the 2009 CONCACAF Gold Cup. He also has been national team captain.

His final international was a September 2010 friendly match against Guatemala.

References

External links
 

1979 births
Living people
People from Chinandega
Association football central defenders
Nicaraguan men's footballers
Nicaragua international footballers
2001 UNCAF Nations Cup players
2003 UNCAF Nations Cup players
2005 UNCAF Nations Cup players
2007 UNCAF Nations Cup players
2009 UNCAF Nations Cup players
2009 CONCACAF Gold Cup players
C.D. Walter Ferretti players
Chinandega FC players
Real Estelí F.C. players
Diriangén FC players